The Sinchuk Hwanguk occurred in 1721. The Noron faction loses power in the aftermath of Shinyim Oksa.

Joseon dynasty
Political history of Korea